Gyál is a district in central-southern part of Pest County. Gyál is also the name of the town where the district seat is found. The district is located in the Central Hungary Statistical Region.

Geography 
Gyál District borders with Budapest to the north, Vecsés District and Monor District to the east, Dabas District to the south, Szigetszentmiklós District to the west. The number of the inhabited places in Gyál District is 4.

Municipalities 
The district has 2 towns, 1 large village and 1 village.
(ordered by population, as of 1 January 2013)

The bolded municipalities are cities, italics municipality is large village.

Demographics

In 2011, it had a population of 40,853 and the population density was 239/km².

Ethnicity
Besides the Hungarian majority, the main minorities are the Roma (approx. 550), Romanian (350) and German (250).

Total population (2011 census): 40,853
Ethnic groups (2011 census): Identified themselves: 36,291 persons:
Hungarians: 34,631 (95.43%)
Gypsies: 549 (1.51%)
Others and indefinable: 1,111 (3.06%)
Approx. 3,500 persons in Gyál District did not declare their ethnic group at the 2011 census.

Religion
Religious adherence in the county according to 2011 census:

Catholic – 11,869 (Roman Catholic – 11,425; Greek Catholic – 442);
Reformed – 6,383;
Evangelical – 291;
other religions – 1,251; 
Non-religious – 7,626; 
Atheism – 573;
Undeclared – 12,860.

Gallery

See also
List of cities and towns in Hungary

References

External links
 Postal codes of the Gyál District

Districts in Pest County